St George's Shopping Centre may refer to:
St George's Shopping Centre (Gravesend), shopping complex in the town of Gravesend, Kent, England
St George's Shopping Centre, Harrow, shopping centre in Harrow, Greater London, owned by RDI REIT
St George's Shopping Centre (Preston), shopping centre in the city of Preston, Lancashire, England